John Lynch (1933 – 5 June 2019) was an Irish Gaelic footballer who played for a number of clubs, including Tuam Stars in the Galway Senior Championship. He played for the Roscommon senior football team for 11 seasons, during which time he usually lined out at full-back.

Honours

Tuam Stars
Galway Senior Football Championship (2): 1960, 1962

Roscommon
Connacht Senior Football Championship (2): 1961, 1962
All-Ireland Minor Football Championship (1): 1951
Connacht Minor Football Championship (1): 1951

References

1933 births
2019 deaths
Tuam Stars Gaelic footballers
Roscommon inter-county Gaelic footballers
Connacht inter-provincial Gaelic footballers